Benjamin Spooner Briggs (April 24, 1835 – likely November 1872) was an experienced United States seaman and master mariner. He was the Captain of the merchant ship Mary Celeste, which was discovered unmanned and drifting in the Atlantic Ocean midway between the Azores and the coast of Portugal  on December 4, 1872. The lifeboat was missing, yet the Mary Celeste herself was still under sail. Benjamin Briggs, his wife Sarah, and their two-year-old daughter Sophia Matilda were never found and are presumed lost, along with the crew of Mary Celeste.

Maritime career
The Briggs family of Massachusetts had a long maritime connection, and Benjamin Briggs himself spent most of his life at sea. He was an experienced, hardy, and able seaman. He reportedly was respected by those who served under him because of his fairness and ability. He worked his way to eventually become a master mariner. Briggs captained the brigantine Sea Foam, and in 1862 became master of the three-masted schooner Forest King. When he took command of the bark Arthur in 1865, he turned over command of the Forest King to his brother, Oliver Briggs. Oliver Briggs was a frequent business partner and sailor with his brother.

Family
Benjamin Briggs was devoutly religious and a believer in abstinence. In 1862, he married Sarah Elizabeth Cobb, daughter of the Reverend Leander Cobb. The newlyweds sailed to Europe in Benjamin's schooner Forest King. Their son, Arthur S. Briggs, was born in 1865 at the family home at Rose Cottage, Marion, Massachusetts. The following year, the family travelled to Marseilles, France, returning in time for their daughter, Sophia Matilda Briggs, to be born on October 31, 1870 at Rose Cottage.

Mary Celeste

In 1871 Briggs and his brother considered giving up the sea and buying a hardware store in New Bedford. In 1872, however, Benjamin Briggs bought a share in the brigantine Mary Celeste, owned by James Winchester, and made modifications to the cabin to house his family. In late 1872, two-year-old Sophia and his wife Sarah accompanied him on the ill-fated voyage from Staten Island, New York, to Genoa, Italy. Their son Arthur stayed with his grandmother at Rose Cottage, Marion, Massachusetts, to attend school.

The following month Briggs' ship was found inexplicably abandoned in the Atlantic Ocean near the Straits of Gibraltar. Briggs, his wife and daughter, and the crew of the Mary Celeste were never found. Their fate remains a mystery.

Legacy
Benjamin Spooner Briggs has living descendants through his son Arthur who was left at home with his grandmother, including Benjamin Yarbrough Briggs, of Boston, Massachusetts and New York City, and John Briggs, of Boston, Massachusetts. 

A cenotaph memorializing the family stands in Evergreen Cemetery, Marion, Massachusetts. The inscription reads: "Capt. Benj S. Briggs born Apr 24, 1835, Sarah E Cobb his wife born Apr 20 1841, Sophia M, their daughter, born Oct 31, 1870. Lost in Brig Mary Celeste Nov 1872" 

Benjamin Spooner Briggs stars as the main protagonist in the game Limbo of the Lost, in which Briggs is caught within a battle between Destiny and Fate.
In the game, Briggs is heavily fictionalized, never mentioning his wife, child or the crew of the Mary Celeste at all during the events of the story, as well as being portrayed as British due to Laurence Francis's voice acting.

See also
List of people who disappeared mysteriously at sea

References

External links
Memorial cenotaph to Briggs

1835 births
1870s missing person cases
1872 deaths
19th-century American people
19th-century sailors
American sailors
Mary Celeste
People from Marion, Massachusetts
People lost at sea